The UK Indie Chart is a weekly chart that ranks the biggest-selling singles that are released on independent record labels in the United Kingdom. The chart is compiled by the Official Charts Company, and is based on both physical and digital single sales. During 2007, 37 singles reached number one.

The biggest-selling indie hit of the year was "Brianstorm" by Arctic Monkeys, which sold over 104,000 copies during 2007, topped the indie chart for four weeks and reached number two on the UK Singles Chart. Other high-selling indie hits 2007 included "Heavyweight Champion of the World" by Reverend and The Makers, which sold approximately 97,000 singles, and "Fluorescent Adolescent" by Arctic Monkeys, which sold more than 96,000 copies.

Eight acts managed to top the UK Indie Chart more than once. They were: Good Shoes, Arctic Monkeys, Elliot Minor, The Pigeon Detectives, Reverend and The Makers, The White Stripes, Jack Peñate and Dizzee Rascal.

Chart-topping singles from the 2007 UK Indie Chart also included "My Baby Left Me", which was re-released by HMV to commemorate the 30th anniversary of the death of Elvis Presley, and topped the chart 51 years after it was first released. Another highlight was "Life's a Treat", the theme tune to the BBC children's TV programme Shaun the Sheep, sung by comedian Vic Reeves, which topped the indie chart in December.

Chart history

See also
List of UK Dance Singles Chart number ones of 2007
List of UK Singles Downloads Chart number ones of the 2000s
List of UK Rock & Metal Singles Chart number ones of 2007
List of UK Singles Chart number ones of the 2000s

References
General

Specific

External links
Independent Singles Chart at the Official Charts Company
UK Top 30 Indie Singles Chart at BBC Radio 1

2007 in British music
United Kingdom Indie Singles
Indie 2007